Lincoln Financial Media was a subsidiary of Lincoln National Corporation that owned radio stations in the United States. The division was formed in 2006 following the company's acquisition of Jefferson-Pilot's television and radio operations, which were renamed Lincoln Financial Media.

The group, at the time of its closure, owned 14 radio stations in Miami, Florida, San Diego, California, Denver, Colorado, and Atlanta, Georgia. It also owned WBT, WBT-FM, and WLNK (FM) in Charlotte, North Carolina and WBTV, the CBS affiliate in Charlotte; WCSC-TV, the CBS affiliate in Charleston, South Carolina and WWBT, the NBC affiliate in Richmond, Virginia. All three of the aforementioned TV stations are now owned by successor company Gray Television.

History
The media company began in 1945 as Jefferson Standard Broadcasting Company, Inc., which became Jefferson-Pilot Communications in 1968. The company was a media-centered division of the Jefferson Standard Insurance Company of Greensboro, North Carolina, which later merged with Pilot Life Insurance Company to form Jefferson-Pilot. Jefferson-Pilot owned WBT-AM-FM and WBTV, all of which are based in Charlotte, North Carolina. In 1962, the company conceived Jefferson Productions (later Jefferson Pilot Teleproductions, later Jefferson Pilot Sports), a production arm that produced television programs and commercials, but later chose to produce syndicated sports programming only by the 1980s. It was originally intended to produce promos and local television shows for WBTV but had since grown to produce nationally syndicated talk shows and variety shows; and mainly commercials for major companies that aired nationwide. For further information, see the section "Lincoln Financial Sports" at the end of this article.

In April 2006, the Jefferson-Pilot Corporation merged with the Lincoln National Corporation; taking the media and sports broadcasting division with it, Jefferson-Pilot Communications became Lincoln Financial Media.

In June 2007, the company publicly announced it would explore a sale of this division, and hired Merrill Lynch to assess its strategic options. On November 12, 2007, Raycom Media announced that it would acquire Lincoln Financial Media's three television stations, along with the Lincoln Financial Sports division (which was folded into Raycom Sports, then into Gray Television) for $583 million. The acquisition was completed in April 2008. 

On December 8, 2014, Entercom (rebranded Audacy, Inc. as of March 30, 2021) announced its intent to acquire the remainder of Lincoln Financial Media for $110 million and working capital. To comply with ownership limits, Entercom was to divest one of its existing stations in Denver. Later, Entercom announced it would swap four of its stations in Denver to Bonneville International in exchange for KSWD in Los Angeles. The merger was completed on July 17 and Bonneville and Entercom began operating their new clusters under time-brokerage agreements that same day.

Former stations
This list also contains stations that were owned by Lincoln Financial Media's predecessor Jefferson-Pilot Communications, before its merger in 2006.

Television
Note: 
 (**) – Indicates that it was built and signed on by Lincoln Financial Media's predecessor Jefferson-Pilot.

Radio

Lincoln Financial Sports

Lincoln Financial Sports, originally Jefferson-Pilot Teleproductions (later Jefferson Pilot Sports), produced and syndicated college sports events of the Southeastern Conference, and co-produced Atlantic Coast Conference sporting events with Raycom Sports. It also produced telecasts of pre-season games of the Carolina Panthers of the National Football League, and in the 1980s, syndicated coverage of the NASCAR Winston Cup races at Charlotte Motor Speedway.

On November 12, 2007, Lincoln Financial Group announced the sale of this division to Raycom Media. The group would later operate under the Raycom Sports banner as of January 1, 2008.

References

External links
Lincoln Financial Group site

   
  
    
   

 
 

Defunct broadcasting companies of the United States
Defunct radio broadcasting companies of the United States
Audacy, Inc.
Gray Television
NASCAR on television